The Roman Catholic Diocese of Kaišiadorys is a diocese located in the city of Kaišiadorys in the Ecclesiastical Province of Vilnius in Lithuania. It was established on 4 April 1926 from the Metropolitan Archdiocese of Vilnius.

Episcopal ordinaries 
(all Roman Rite)

Bishops 
 Juozapas Kukta (5 April 1926 – 16 June 1942 Died)
 Teofilius Matulionis (9 January 1943 – 20 August 1962 Died)
 Juozapas Matulaitis-Labukas (24 December 1991 – 11 February 2012 Retired)
 Jonas Ivanauskas (11 February 2012 – )

Apostolic administrators 
Between 1982 and 1991, Kaišiadorys was led by Apostolic Administrators rather than bishops.
 Vincentas Sladkevičius, MIC (15 July 1982 – 10 March 1989)
 Juozapas Matulaitis-Labukas (10 March 1989 – 24 December 1991)

See also 
 List of Roman Catholic dioceses of Lithuania

References 
 GCatholic.org
 Catholic Hierarchy
  Diocese website

Roman Catholic dioceses in Lithuania
Christian organizations established in 1926
Roman Catholic dioceses and prelatures established in the 20th century
Kaišiadorys